The 2017 Taça de Angola was the 36th edition of the Taça de Angola, the second most important and the top knock-out football club competition following the Girabola. 

The winner qualified to the 2018 CAF Confederation Cup.

Stadia and locations

Championship bracket

Preliminary rounds

Round of 16

Quarter-finals

Semi-finals

Final

See also
 2017 Girabola
 
 2018 CAF Confederation Cup

External links
 profile at girabola.com

References

Angola Cup
Cup
Angola